Manassakshi is a 1968 Indian Kannada-language film, directed by S. K. A. Chari and produced by A. L. Srinivasan. The film stars Rajkumar, Bharathi, Narasimharaju and M. P. Shankar. The film has musical score by G. K. Venkatesh. The movie was a remake of the 1961 Tamil movie Thirudadhe which itself was a remake of 1956 Hindi movie Pocket Maar.

Cast

Rajkumar as Somanna
Bharathi Vishnuvardhan as Gowri
Sowcar Janaki in a cameo
Narasimharaju as Bhoopathi
M. P. Shankar
Shylashri
Ranga
Nagappa
Suryakumar
H. R. Shastry
Guggu
Shivaji
Govindaraj
B. V. Radha
Sadhana
M. Jayashree
Shanthamma
Baby Nagamani

Soundtrack
The music was composed by G. K. Venkatesh.

References

External links
 
 

1968 films
1960s Kannada-language films
Films scored by G. K. Venkatesh
Kannada remakes of Tamil films